Joseph Biel (February 22, 1859 – April 18, 1944) was an American politician, farmer, and businessman.

Born in Bavaria, Germany, Biel emigrated with his parents to the United States in 1861 and settled in Dodge County, Wisconsin. He went to public school. Biel had a farm in the town of Westford, in Dodge County. He was also involved with the Westford Mutual Fire Insurance Company. Biel served as chairman of the Westford Town Board. He also served on the school board. In 1915, Biel served in the Wisconsin State Assembly and was a Democrat. Biel died in a hospital in Beaver Dam, Wisconsin.

Notes

1859 births
1944 deaths
German emigrants to the United States
People from the Kingdom of Bavaria
People from Dodge County, Wisconsin
Businesspeople from Wisconsin
Farmers from Wisconsin
Mayors of places in Wisconsin
School board members in Wisconsin
Democratic Party members of the Wisconsin State Assembly